Big Brother is the Croatian version of the international reality television franchise Big Brother created by producer John de Mol in 1997. The show was aired on RTL Televizija. It followed a number of contestants who live in an isolated house trying to avoid being evicted by the public with the aim of winning a large cash prize at the end of the run. Throughout the season, housemates are completing tasks, every incomplete task reduces the prize.

In the first four regular seasons and the celebrity season, the house was located in Jadran Film studios, in Dubrava, Zagreb. In the fifth season, the house used is the Big Brother Thailand house.

There have been seven regular seasons and one celebrity season. Big Brother holds the record for having the most regular seasons with only male contestants winning the show each year (although the celebrity edition was won by a woman).

Series details

Original seasons

Celebrity season
In 2008, RTL Televizija launched a special celebrity season of Big Brother. Celebrities entered the house for charity. However, due to low ratings, the celebrity season was ended one week before it planned.

Regional seasons
In 2011, Big Brother Croatia joins the regional version of Big Brother — Veliki Brat. The show features contestants from Croatia, Macedonia, Serbia, Montenegro and Bosnia and Herzegovina.

External links 

 Official Website on RTL Televizija

 
Croatian reality television series
2004 Croatian television series debuts
RTL (Croatian TV channel) original programming